The great flood theme, in which a flood almost wipes out the entire human race followed by the procreation of a brother and sister pair to repopulate the earth, is a popular mythological theme in China. Chen Jianxian (1996) said that this theme was one of the more popular legends which was still being told by more than 40 ethnics in China. There is a possibility that the myth is newer than the other Chinese great flood mythologies, because the oldest recorded sources about this myth were from Six Dynasties, save that the oral tradition maybe much older. The myth narrates a brother and sister incest and often confused with the myth of Nüwa and Fuxi (Shan Hai Jing described both the divine ancestors as brother and sister who married each other to populated the earth with human beings). Another version paired Pangu with his unnamed older sister as the main characters of this myth.

The theme has several variations, but the outline describes a great flood which destroyed all the humans all over the world except a pair of brother and sister, or aunt and nephew. Both ended up married in order to repopulate the world. One version stated that their children were ordinary humans, while the others said it was a lump of meat, gourd, melon, or grindstone; after they opened, cut, or destroyed it, humans emerged.

The Thunder God's Revenge
Chen Jianxian presumed the origin of this myth is from Miao people. In this version, the story begin with the dissension between the human ancestor whose name is varied with the thunder god. One day, the human ancestor managed to confine the thunder god, but his children (sometimes named as Fuxi and Nüwa) released him out of pity. The thunder god gave them a seed of gourd or pumpkin or his own tooth and told them that there would be a great flood. All the humans perished except the brother and sister who hid themselves inside the gourd. To repopulate the earth, they married each other after receiving  an "agreement sign from the heaven" (which is different depends on the sources). Some versions said that the sister gave birth to a gourd; both cut the gourd into pieces and each pieces became the ancestors of different tribes, and so on. There are other similar versions as written below.

Once upon a time, a farmer was working in his field when he heard thunder. He took his children (Nüwa and Fuxi) inside their house, prepared an iron cage, and armed with pitchfork. When the thunder god Lei Gong appeared with his thunder axe, the farmer stabbed him and locked him inside the cage. The farmer planned to kill the god and pickle him, and he went into the market to buy the spices after warning his children not to go near the god and gave him anything to eat or drink. Both the kids obeyed their father until they pitied the thunder god who asked them for food and water. After the kids gave him a drop of water, his strength was returned and he freed himself from the cage. He gave the frightened kids his own tooth to be planted, which grew into a gourd plant. Lei Gong leaped into the sky and commanded the rain god to pour the water as heavy as he could.

Meanwhile, the farmer came into his house, the flood was already as high as his knees. He knew what happened and made a boat, put his children inside the magical gourd, and climbed into the boat. The water level continued to rise until it almost reach the heaven. The farmer knocked the heaven's gate and asked Taidi to stop the rain. Taidi realized what was about to be happened and ordered the water god to get rid of the water at once. The water was gone, the boat was falling from the sky and crashing into the ground along with the farmer, but his children inside the gourd was safe. After they climbed out of the gourd, both the kids realized that they were the only survivors of human kinds and decided to married and repopulated the earth.

A bit different version named the survivor boy as A Zie. After the flood, he planned to married his older sister to in order to repopulate the earth but was rejected because she was hesitant to violate the incest taboo. After reasoning with her, she agreed to accept his marriage proposal with a condition: they should both go up to the top of opposite hills, taking with them each a part of a millstone, and roll the millstone down into the valley in the middle. If both parts of the millstones manage to perfectly collide straight into each other, she would marry her younger brother. A Zie, realising that his sister's condition was almost impossible, prepared already collided millstones in the bottom of the valley without her knowledge before they climbed on the hills and rolled their millstones, making it appear as if he won. But his sister did not expect this and was still reluctant, so she proposed another condition which was the same as the first one but the objects they would carry would be different. He carried a knife and she carried its sheath; she would marry her younger brother only if the knife was inserted into the sheath. A Zie made the same trick by setting up a duplicate knife and sheath in advance. Finally she agreed to the marriage, and they consummated. She conceived and bore her younger brother's first child, which was a lump of meat without arms and legs. The maddened A Zie cut off their offspring into pieces and scattered it to the rest of the hill. The next morning the pieces of the meat became both male and female humans, making A Zie and his older sister the progenitors of the humans that lived after the flood.

There are another version which stated that the brother could not meet his sister's condition and so both of them were not married. They created living humans from clay. While they dried the clay dolls under the sun, the rain was pouring and the couple tried to save their creations. Unfortunately, some of the dolls lost their arms, legs, eyes, and so forth, explained why some people are disabled.

Human Ancestor Marries a Heavenly Maiden
The theme is spread among Nakhi and Yi people. There were some brothers who worked at their field but their work was undone in the next morning; this happened for several days. The brothers found out that every nights their field was being spoiled by a boar. They planned to kill the boar except one; and for his benevolent, the boar which was actually a god told him that there would be a devastating great flood on its way. The youth climbed into a leather-covered drum or wooden box, which was carried into the heaven by the ever-rising water level. In heaven, he met a heavenly maiden and fell in love with her. He must pass a series of tests before they are able to be married, while their offspring  became the ancestors of the Tibetan, Nakhis, and Bais.

The last version is a mixture from different myths. There were two brothers and one sister who hoed the field, which was vandalized by a god. The god later told them for the coming great flood, he told the younger brother and sister to aboard on a giant gourd, while to the older ill-tempered brother into a stone boat. The brother and sister inside the giant gourd were saved. He married his older sister, and she bore him a boy who eventually married a heavenly maiden.

See also
Chinese mythology
Flood myth
Flood Mythology of China
Great flood of Gun-Yu
Nüwa Mends the Heavens

References

Chinese mythology
Floods in China